Magnus James Mitchell Hughson (13 December 1915 – 20 June 1992) was an Australian rules footballer who played with Fitzroy in the Victorian Football League (VFL).

Notes

External links 

1915 births
1992 deaths
Australian rules footballers from Melbourne
Fitzroy Football Club players
People from Northcote, Victoria